Dexter Benedict St. Louis  (21 March 1968 – 16 May 2019) was a Trinidadian table tennis player. In January 2013, he was ranked no. 342 in the world by the International Table Tennis Federation (ITTF).

St. Louis made his official debut for the 1996 Summer Olympics in Atlanta, Georgia, where he competed in the men's singles. He placed fourth in a group pool round against Brazil's Hugo Hoyama, Sweden's Jörgen Persson, and North Korea's Kim Song-Hui, with a total score of 82 points and a tally of 3 straight losses.

Twelve years after competing in his last Olympics, St. Louis qualified again for the men's singles, as a 40-year-old, at the 2008 Summer Olympics in Beijing, by winning the Latin American Qualification Tournament in Santo Domingo, Dominican Republic. He lost the first preliminary round match to Canada's Zhang Peng, with a unanimous set score of 0–4.

References

External links
 
 
 
 
 

1968 births
2019 deaths
Trinidad and Tobago male table tennis players
Olympic table tennis players of Trinidad and Tobago
Table tennis players at the 1996 Summer Olympics
Table tennis players at the 2008 Summer Olympics
Table tennis players at the 2018 Commonwealth Games
Commonwealth Games competitors for Trinidad and Tobago